Admiral Sir Harold Thomas Coulthard Walker KCB (18 March 1891 – 25 December 1975) was a Royal Navy officer who commanded the 3rd Battle Squadron.

Naval career
Walker joined the Royal Navy as a midshipman in 1908. He served in World War I and saw action during the Zeebrugge Raid in 1918. He became deputy director of Training and Staff Duties at the Admiralty in 1936, commanding officer of the battlecruiser HMS Hood in 1938 and commanding officer of the battleship HMS Barham in 1939. He also served in World War II becoming Commodore at Portsmouth Dockyard in 1940, Director of Personal Services at the Admiralty in 1941 and Commander of the 5th Cruiser Squadron in 1944. He convened the second and more thorough inquiry into the sinking of HMS Hood, which came to the same conclusion as the first inquiry although other theories have been mooted.

He went on to be Commander of the 3rd Battle Squadron and Second in Command of the East Indies Fleet in 1944. After the War he became Commander of British Naval Forces Germany in 1946 before retiring in 1948.

References

1891 births
1975 deaths
Knights Commander of the Order of the Bath
Royal Navy admirals